Led Zeppelin's Summer 1970 North American Tour was the sixth concert tour of North America by the English rock band. The tour commenced on 10 August and concluded on 19 September 1970.

Overview
This concert tour was a massive success for Led Zeppelin, as they played to wildly enthusiastic audiences. It was their highest-grossing tour to date (for the two New York City concerts alone, the band grossed $100,000). With The Rolling Stones off the road at the time, only The Who could now compete with Led Zeppelin for the title of the world's top concert attraction. The band were widely hailed as bigger than The Beatles, dethroning them in the polls for the first time in rock history.

This concert tour was originally scheduled to commence on 5 August at Cincinnati.  However, the first week was rescheduled due to the ill health of the father of bass player John Paul Jones. The itinerary was amended several times, leading to much confusion, with the band erroneously being billed to appear at the Strawberry Fields Festival on the weekend of August 8–9. The tour eventually commenced on August 10 at Hampton.

During this tour the band mixed their third album at Ardent Studios, Memphis, in August 1970. The album was released in October 1970, shortly following the conclusion of this tour.

Tour set list
The fairly typical set list for the tour was:

"Immigrant Song" (Page, Plant)
"Heartbreaker" (Bonham, Page, Plant)
"Dazed and Confused" (Page)
"Bring It On Home" (Page, Plant, Dixon)
"That's the Way" (Page, Plant)
"Bron-Yr-Aur" (Page)
"Since I've Been Loving You" (Page, Plant, Jones)
"Organ Solo"/"Thank You" (Page, Plant)
"What Is and What Should Never Be" (Page, Plant)
"Moby Dick" (Page, Jones, Bonham)
"Whole Lotta Love" (Bonham, Dixon, Jones, Page, Plant)

Encore:
"Communication Breakdown" (Bonham, Jones, Page)
"Out on the Tiles" (Page, Plant, Bonham) (On 4 September, 6 September (late), and 19 September)
"How Many More Times" (Page, Jones, Bonham) (On 19 September)
"Train Kept A-Rollin' (Bradshaw, Kay, Mann) (On 2 September)
"Blueberry Hill" (Lewis, Stock) (On 2 September and 4 September)
"Babe I'm Gonna Leave You" (Bredon, Page, Plant) (On 6 September (late))

There were some set list substitutions, variations, and order switches during the tour.

Tour dates
The original itinerary before John Paul Jones' father's illness was:

While the final tour dates were:

References

External links
Comprehensive archive of known concert appearances by Led Zeppelin (official website)
Led Zeppelin concert setlists

Sources
Lewis, Dave and Pallett, Simon (1997) Led Zeppelin: The Concert File, London: Omnibus Press. .

Led Zeppelin concert tours
1970 concert tours
1970 in North America